Edward Sinclair Perry (3 February 1914 – 29 August 1977) was an English actor who played the role of verger Maurice Yeatman in Dad's Army. He also made appearances in Z-Cars and Danger Man.

The earliest work in his belated main career was in radio before being noticed and offered small parts on television. His first appearance in Dad's Army was in the fifth episode (before audiences had been introduced to the Vicar) as the caretaker, playing the verger from the second series.

He also appeared in several films and theatre productions, and was being offered work in panto just as the series finished, but died soon after from a heart attack while on holiday in Cheddar, Somerset. This came as a shock to the cast, and it was Arthur Lowe who stated at his funeral service, "With the loss of Teddy, it is now quite clear that there will be no more Dad's Army."

He was born and married as Edward Sinclair, although his death was registered as Edward Sinclair Perry.

Selected filmography
 The Magic Christian (1969) - Park Attendant (uncredited)
 Dad's Army (1971) - Verger Maurice Yeatman
 No Sex Please, We're British (1973) - Postman

References

External links
 

1914 births
1977 deaths
20th-century English male actors
British Army personnel of World War II
British male comedy actors
English male film actors
English male radio actors
English male stage actors
English male television actors
Male actors from Oldham
Military personnel from Lancashire
Oxfordshire and Buckinghamshire Light Infantry soldiers